Catherine Britt is the fourth studio album by Australian country music singer Catherine Britt. The album was released in May 2010 and peaked at number 73 on the ARIA Charts.
 
At the ARIA Music Awards of 2010, the album was nominated for the ARIA Award for Best Country Album.

Track listing

Charts

Weekly charts

Year-end charts

Release history

References

 

2010 albums
Catherine Britt albums
Albums produced by Shane Nicholson (singer)